Sulfidostannates, or thiostannates are chemical compounds containing anions composed of tin linked with sulfur. They can be considered as stannates with sulfur substituting for oxygen. Related compounds include the thiosilicates, and thiogermannates,  and by varying the chalcogen: selenostannates, and tellurostannates. Oxothiostannates have oxygen in addition to sulfur. Thiostannates can be classed as chalcogenidometalates, thiometallates, chalcogenidotetrelates, thiotetrelates, and chalcogenidostannates. Tin is almost always in the +4 oxidation state in thiostannates, although a couple of mixed sulfides in the +2 state are known,

Some thiostannate minerals are known. In nature the tin can be partly replaced by arsenic, germanium, antimony or indium. Many thiostannate minerals contain copper, silver or lead. In the field of mineralogy, these compound can be termed sulfostannates or sulphostannates.

Different cluster anions are known: [SnS4]4–, [SnS3]2–, [Sn2S5]2–, [Sn2S6]4–, [Sn2S7]6–, [Sn2S8]2–, [Sn3S7]2–, [Sn4S9]2–, [Sn5S12]4–, or [Sn4S10]4–.

The number of sulfur atoms coordinated around the tin atom is most commonly four. However there are also complexes with five or six sulfur atoms surrounding the tin. The behaviour for selenium and tellurium differs as only five selenium or four tellurium atoms can bind to a tin atom. The smaller germanium atom can only accommodate four sulfur atoms. For lead it is hard for it to be in the +4 oxidation state. The SnSn polyhedrons can be standalone in strongly alkaline conditions, or at higher concentrations or less alkaline can condense together. Polyhedra shapes are tetrahedron for four, trigonal bipyramid for five, and octahedron for six sulfur atoms. The polyhedra can be connected at a vertex (corner), or at an edge. Where connected at an edge, four membered rings of -SnSSnS- with internal angles close to 90°. [Sn2S7]6– is corner bridged. Tetrahedra linked by at the corner by a disulfur bridge are unknown.

Sn10O4S208- is a supertetrahedron made from 1, 3 and 6 tin atoms connected by oxygen on the interior and sulfur on the surface.

Synthesis 
The first human production of a thiostannate heated tin oxide with sodium carbonate and sulfur:

2SnO2 + 2Na2CO3 + 9S → 2Na2SnS3 + 2CO2 + 3SO2

Transition metal complexes may be prepared by crystallisation from the ligand solvent.

Copper(II) is normally reduced by sulfide S2- in thiostannates to copper(I).

Anions

Reactions 
Some hydrates are unstable, where water reacts with the sulfide to make hydrogen sulfide gas.

List

References 

Tin compounds
Sulfides